The Horseshoe Falls, a tieredcascade waterfall, is located in the Central Highlands region of Tasmania, Australia.

Location and features
The waterfall descends over horizontal marine Permian siltstone benches, while the vertical faces of the falls are composed of resistant sandstone layers.

Gallery

See also

 List of waterfalls of Tasmania

References

External links
 

Waterfalls of Tasmania
Central Highlands (Tasmania)
Cascade waterfalls
Tiered waterfalls